The 2018 Firenze Tennis Cup was a professional tennis tournament played on clay courts. It was the first edition of the tournament which was part of the 2018 ATP Challenger Tour. It took place in Florence, Italy between 1 October and 7 October 2018.

Singles main-draw entrants

Seeds

 1 Rankings are as of 24 September 2018.

Other entrants
The following players received wildcards into the singles main draw:
  Enrico Dalla Valle
  Giovanni Fonio
  Julian Ocleppo
  Andrea Pellegrino

The following players received entry from the qualifying draw:
  Francesco Forti
  Kevin Krawietz
  Gianluca Mager
  Jelle Sels

The following players received entry as lucky losers:
  Zizou Bergs
  João Menezes

Champions

Singles

 Pablo Andújar def.  Marco Trungelliti 7–5, 6–3.

Doubles

 Rameez Junaid /  David Pel def.  Filippo Baldi /  Salvatore Caruso, 7–5, 3–6, [10–7].

References

2018 ATP Challenger Tour
2018 in Italian tennis